Orenburgsky District is an administrative and municipal district (raion), one of the thirty-five in Orenburg Oblast, Russia. It is located in the center of the oblast. Its administrative center is the city of Orenburg (which is not administratively a part of the district). Population: 74,404 (2010 Census);

Administrative and municipal status
Within the framework of administrative divisions, Orenburgsky District is one of the thirty-five in the oblast. The city of Orenburg serves as its administrative center, despite being incorporated separately as an administrative unit with the status equal to that of the districts.

As a municipal division, the district is incorporated as Orenburgsky Municipal District. The City of Orenburg is incorporated separately from the district as Orenburg Urban Okrug.

References

Notes

Sources

Districts of Orenburg Oblast

